El-Ourit Waterfalls are located seven kilometers from the city of Tlemcen, near the National Road of Algeria in a mountainous area covered with pine trees. Seven stepped cascades form the natural site of Oued El-Ourit, which remained dry for 40 years before reappearing in 2009. 

Waterfalls of Algeria
Geography of Tlemcen Province